Tantonville Airfield is an abandoned World War II United States Army Air Forces military airfield in France, which was located in the Département de Meurthe-et-Moselle approximately  north of Mirecourt and  south-southeast of Neuves-Maisons.

History

The airfield was constructed by the IX Engineer Command as a temporary facility, with a 5000' x 120' all weather pierced steel planking (PSP) runway, aligned 01/19.   In addition the airfield contained a large  parking apron, as well as for dispersal sites. Tents were used for billeting and also for support facilities; an access road was built to the existing road infrastructure; a dump for supplies, ammunition, and gasoline drums, along with a drinkable water and minimal electrical grid for communications and station lighting.  It was known as Tantonville  Airfield or Advanced Landing Ground Y-1 and released to Ninth Air Force on 25 December 1944.

The XIX Tactical Air Command 100th Fighter Wing 371st Fighter Group moved onto the field even before it was officially completed on 20 December, with three squadrons of P-47 Thunderbolts.   They remained until 15 February until moving east.

The Twelfth Air Force 86th Fighter Group and its 525th, 526th, and 527th Squadrons operated P-47 Thunderbolts from the airfield between late February to mid-April 1945 before moving east to a captured Luftwaffe airfield at Braunshardt, Germany (Y-72) near Darmstadt.

After the 86th moved out the airfield was manned by the 98th Service Squadron.  It was used as a resupply and casualty evacuation airfield for the balance of the war.  It was then dismantled and the land returned to civil authorities on 11 May 1945.  The area where Tantonville Airfield was constructed is now an agricultural area, although the ground still shows evidence of its runway and parking apron.

See also

 Advanced Landing Ground

References

 Johnson, David C. (1988), U.S. Army Air Forces Continental Airfields (ETO), D-Day to V-E Day; Research Division, USAF Historical Research Center, Maxwell AFB, Alabama.
 Maurer, Maurer. Air Force Combat Units of World War II. Maxwell AFB, Alabama: Office of Air Force History, 1983. .
 
 IX Engineering Command ETO Airfields layout

External links

World War II airfields in France
Airfields of the United States Army Air Forces in France
Airports established in 1945